Rosa U. Gill (born June 5, 1943) is a Democratic member of the North Carolina House of Representatives. She has represented the 33rd district (including constituents in eastern Wake County) since her initial appointment in 2009.

Career
A longtime Wake County mathematics teacher, Gill ran unsuccessfully for the Wake County Board of Commissioners in 1988. She later was elected to the Wake County School Board, where she served from 1999 to 2009. Following the death of Senator Vernon Malone, then State Rep. Dan Blue was appointed to fill the balance of Malone's term in the Senate. Gill was then appointed to Blue's former House seat, where she has served since 2009. Gill has been re-elected to the seat a total of 7 times, most recently in 2022.

Electoral history

2020

2018

2016

2014

2012

2010

Committee assignments

2021-2022 session
Appropriations
Appropriations - Education
Pensions and Retirement (Vice-Chair)
Education - K-12
Insurance
Judiciary I

2019-2020 session
Appropriations
Appropriations - Education
Pensions and Retirement
Education - K-12
Education - Community Colleges
Insurance
Judiciary

2017-2018 session
Appropriations
Appropriations - Education
Pensions and Retirement
Education - K-12
Insurance (Vice Chair)
Alcoholic Beverage Control
Homelessness, Foster Care, and Dependency
State and Local Government I

2015-2016 session
Appropriations
Appropriations - Education (Vice Chair)
Insurance (Vice Chair)
Pensions and Retirement
Alcoholic Beverage Control
Children, Youth and Families
Elections

2013-2014 session
Appropriations
Education
State Personnel (Vice Chair)
Government
Public Utilities
Transportation

2011-2012 session
Appropriations
Education
Government
Public Utilities
Transportation

2009-2010 session
Appropriations
Education
Election Law and Campaign Finance Reform
Judiciary II
State Government/State Personnel

References

External links

Living people
1943 births
People from Apex, North Carolina
Politicians from Raleigh, North Carolina
Shaw University alumni
Democratic Party members of the North Carolina House of Representatives
Educators from North Carolina
African-American women in politics
African-American state legislators in North Carolina
21st-century American politicians
21st-century American women politicians
20th-century American educators
21st-century American educators
20th-century American women educators
21st-century American women educators
20th-century African-American women
20th-century African-American people
20th-century African-American educators
21st-century African-American women
21st-century African-American politicians